Spicara smaris, one of the picarels, is a species of ray-finned fish native to the eastern Atlantic Ocean, the Mediterranean Sea and the Black Sea.

Description
It is a more slender fish than the closely related blotched picarel (Spicara maena) and can be distinguished from that species by having 75–81 scales along the lateral line rather than 68–70. Its back is grey-brown and it has silvery flanks with a large black spot located above the tip of the pectoral fin. Male fish are usually larger than females and have small blue spots scattered across the dorsal and anal fins.

Distribution and habitat
Spicara smaris is native to the subtropical eastern Atlantic Ocean including the coasts of Portugal, the Canary Islands and Morocco, the Mediterranean Sea and the Black Sea. It is usually found in seagrass meadows and over sandy and muddy seabeds.

Biology
Spicara smaris is a sociable fish, forming large groups with others of its species. 
It is a protogynous sequential hermaphrodite, individuals maturing as females and becoming males at some later point. Breeding takes place once a year and the colour of a male becomes brighter at this time. The male will scoop out a nest in soft sediment in which the female will lay eggs. The male then guards these until they hatch, after which time his bright colours fade and he rejoins other schooling fish.

Classification
Spicara smaris was removed from the family Centracanthidae and placed in family Sparidae in 2014.

As food

Spicara smaris is a popular food in parts of southern Italy, Dalmatia, and Greece. In Dalmatia, salted picarel, slana gira, are popular. Picarel is one of the five most commonly caught fish in Cyprus. In Greece and Cyprus, picarel, marida, is generally battered and fried, and eaten whole, including the head, tail, and bones.

References

External links
 

Sparidae
Fish described in 1758
Taxa named by Carl Linnaeus